John Spencer Bassett (September 10, 1867 – January 27, 1928) was an American historian. He was a professor at Trinity College (today  Duke University), and is best known today for the "Bassett Affair" in 1903 when he publicly criticized racism among Southern elites,  and called Booker T. Washington, "all in all the greatest man, save General Lee, born in the South in 100 years."  Despite widespread outrage, the college trustees refused to accept Bassett's resignation by a vote of 18 to 7.  After Trinity, he became a professor of history at Smith College in Massachusetts. and was the executive director of the American Historical Association for many years.

Early life and education
Bassett was born September 10, 1867, in Tarboro, North Carolina. John Spencer Bassett was the second of seven children of Richard Baxter Bassett (son of Richard and Caroline Spencer Bassett) who was born September 20, 1832, in Williamsburg, Virginia, and died March 25, 1902, in Goldsboro, North Carolina; and Mary Jane Wilson (daughter of John Wilson and Susannah Dunn of Maine), born November 7, 1845, in Edgecombe County, North Carolina, and died September 1, 1903, in Durham, North Carolina. Both of his parents are buried in Willow Dale Cemetery in Goldsboro, Wayne County, North Carolina.

He entered Trinity College (now Duke University) in 1886, as a junior, graduating with an A.B. in history. In 1894 he earned a Ph.D in history from Johns Hopkins University, under the direction of Herbert Baxter Adams.  As one of the first PhD's trained at Johns Hopkins University in Baltimore, he was introduced to a new, research-based higher education.

Career

The Bassett Affair

In 1902 Bassett launched the South Atlantic Quarterly, a journal whose purpose was to promote the "literary, historical, and social development of the South." It was from this journal that Bassett began to challenge more aggressively the southern press and prevailing sentiments about southern history and issues revolving around race.
In October 1903 he published an article in the South Atlantic Quarterly titled "Stirring Up the Fires of Racial Antipathy" triggering a controversy that nearly cost the young professor his job. In the article, he spoke about improving race relations and gave praise to numerous African Americans. Near the end of the article, he wrote "...Booker T. Washington [is] the greatest man, save General Lee, born in the South in a hundred years..."

This led to an outpouring of anger from powerful Democratic Party leaders as well as the media and public. The most vociferous of which was the Raleigh News and Observer and its editor, Josephus Daniels. Many demanded that Bassett be fired and encouraged parents to take their children out of the university. Due to immense public pressure, Bassett offered his resignation if the Board of Trustees requested that he do so. The Board of Trustees then held a meeting to decide; in the end, they voted 18-7 not to accept the resignation citing academic freedom. In their decision, they wrote, "We are particularly unwilling to lend ourselves to any tendency to destroy or limit academic liberty, a tendency which has, within recent years, manifested itself in some conspicuous instances, and which has created a feeling of uneasiness for the welfare of American colleges [...] We cannot lend countenance to the degrading notion that professors in American colleges have not an equal liberty of thought and speech with all other Americans." In 1905, President Theodore Roosevelt commended Trinity and Bassett's courageous stand for academic freedom while speaking to the university. He told the school, "You stand for Academic Freedom, for the right of private judgment, for a duty more incumbent upon the scholar than upon any other man, to tell the truth as he sees it, to claim for himself and to give to others the largest liberty in seeking after the truth."

Post-affair career
In 1906, he became a professor at Smith College in Massachusetts.  After 1919, he was the long-time secretary (Executive Director) of the American Historical Association, and helped to stabilize its finances through an endowment. He was elected a Fellow of the American Academy of Arts and Sciences in 1921.

He wrote numerous books on North Carolina, a major biography of Andrew Jackson,  several textbooks,  and produced carefully edited editions of important primary sources, most notably his seven volume Correspondence of Andrew Jackson (1926-1935).

Personal life
In Forsyth, North Carolina on August 10, 1892, John Spencer Bassett married Jessie Lewellin. She was born January 31, 1866, in Clarksville, Mecklenburg County, Virginia; died April 3, 1950, in Northampton, Massachusetts. John Spencer Bassett and Jessie Lewellin Bassett are buried in the Bridge Street Cemetery, Northampton, Massachusetts. They had two children:
Richard Horace Bassett (1900-1995)
Margaret Byrd Bassett (1902–1982)
Bassett died 27 January 1928 in Washington, DC.

Memorials 
 A freshman residence hall on Duke's East Campus is named for Bassett.

Archival materials
The John Spencer Bassett papers at the Library of Congress include 25,450 items.
 Papers regarding to his time at Trinity are located in the Duke University Library.

References

Further reading
 
 Doherty, Herbert J. "John Spencer Bassett" in Clyde N. Wilson, ed. Twentieth-century American Historians (Gale Research Company, 1983) pp 19–32
 Stephenson, Wendell H.  "John Spencer Bassett as a Historian of the South," North Carolina Historical Review  volume 25 (1948) 289-317

External links 

Bassett's Duke page

1867 births
1928 deaths
19th-century American historians
19th-century American male writers
Duke University Trinity College of Arts and Sciences alumni
Duke University faculty
Fellows of the American Academy of Arts and Sciences
Johns Hopkins University alumni
People from Tarboro, North Carolina
Smith College faculty
20th-century American historians
American male non-fiction writers
Members of the American Academy of Arts and Letters